"South Africa" is an episode of the British comedy television series The Goodies.

This episode is also known as "Apartheight" and as "A South African Adventure".

Written by The Goodies, with songs and music by Bill Oddie.

Plot
The Goodies are hired by a maniacally racist South African tourist agent to make an advertisement encouraging Britons to come to South Africa.  However, the tourist agent is unhappy with what they have done, since they showed black people in South Africa having a good time. Tim points out that South Africa has many black people, but the tourist agent retorts that they are not having a good time. The enraged agent forces the Goodies to emigrate to South Africa.

The influx of tourist boats the Goodies' advertisement brings allows the black people an opportunity to get away from South Africa, leading to apartheid segregation disintegrating. To keep the economy going, apartheid is replaced by the new segregation of apartheight (apart-height). Tim and Graeme are tall enough not to be affected — but Bill is not quite tall enough.  Bill, and the South African jockeys, are now treated as the second class citizens of South Africa, and are put under curfew.  Bill is also forced to work for Tim and Graeme, who both take full advantage of Bill's newly disadvantaged position and treat him like a slave.  Bill takes charge of the situation, and he and the jockeys rebel and eventually win out against their 'masters'.

The Goodies return to the UK, however since they have been gone the society appears to have changed to a reverse form of apartheid, with the goodies being given bags to carry by black people and the queen appearing to be black. The Goodies shrug at this and begin putting on blackface.

Cultural references
 The Black and White Minstrel Show
 Song of the South

DVD and VHS releases

This episode has been released on DVD.

References

Bibliography
 "The Complete Goodies" — Robert Ross, B T Batsford, London, 2000
 "The Goodies Rule OK" — Robert Ross, Carlton Books Ltd, Sydney, 2006
 "From Fringe to Flying Circus — 'Celebrating a Unique Generation of Comedy 1960-1980'" — Roger Wilmut, Eyre Methuen Ltd, 1980
 "The Goodies Episode Summaries" — Brett Allender
 "The Goodies — Fact File" — Matthew K. Sharp
 "TV Heaven" — Jim Sangster & Paul Condon, HarperCollinsPublishers, London, 2005

External links
 

The Goodies (series 5) episodes
1975 British television episodes